Sevenia consors is a butterfly in the family Nymphalidae. It is found in Angola, western Zambia, the southern part of the Democratic Republic of the Congo and the Republic of the Congo.

References

Butterflies described in 1903
consors
Butterflies of Africa
Taxa named by Karl Jordan